Stephan Andrei Anlocotan, who is better known by his screen name Prince Stefan (born February 13, 1989 in Iloilo City, Philippines), is a Filipino comedian and actor of Saudi Arabian-Filipino descent.

Career
Stefan appeared on StarStruck: The Next Level, and on several GMA Network shows including the telefantasya Mga Mata ni Anghelita and SOP Rules. As of September 1, 2007, Stefan also became a Regal Films contract star.

In 2008, Stefan played a supporting role in Magdusa Ka and a small anatologist role in Luna Mystika. The following year, Stefan appeared in Ang Babaeng Hinugot Sa Aking Tadyang.

After taking a break from showbiz, he transferred to ABS-CBN in 2015.

Personal life
Stefan is openly gay. He was in a relationship with Singapore-based model Paolo Amores.

Filmography

Television

Movies

Awards and nominations

References

External links
Prince Stefan
Prince Stefan at iGMA.tv

1989 births
Living people
21st-century Filipino male actors
Filipino male child actors
Filipino male film actors
Filipino male television actors
Filipino people of Saudi Arabian descent
People from Iloilo City
Male actors from Iloilo
Participants in Philippine reality television series
StarStruck (Philippine TV series) participants
GMA Network personalities
ABS-CBN personalities
Star Magic
Viva Artists Agency
Filipino gay actors
Visayan people
Hiligaynon people